Villiers-sur-Orge (literally Villiers on Orge) is a commune in the arrondissement of Palaiseau, in the Essonne department, in the Île-de-France region.

Inhabitants of Villiers-sur-Orge are known as Villiérains.

Sites of interest
 Town hall
 Saint-Claude chapel

Location and transport
As the name suggests Villiers-sur-Orge is situated on the bank of the small river Orge.  The Orge separates Villiers-sur-Orge from neighbouring Sainte-Geneviève-des-Bois.

Villiers-sur-Orge is located in the southern suburbs (banlieue) of Paris, France and can be accessed by car from the Francilienne ring road and the A6 motorway (part of the Autoroute du Soleil). The nearest train station is in neighbouring Sainte-Geneviève-des-Bois (RER line C).

See also
Communes of the Essonne department

References

External links

Official website 
Mayors of Essonne Association 

Communes of Essonne